Kye Yong-sun(계영순)  (born 27 March 1972) is a North Korean women's international footballer who plays as a goalkeeper. She is a member of the North Korea women's national football team. She was part of the team at the 1999 FIFA Women's World Cup.

References

1972 births
Living people
North Korean women's footballers
North Korea women's international footballers
Place of birth missing (living people)
1999 FIFA Women's World Cup players
Women's association football goalkeepers
Footballers at the 1998 Asian Games
Asian Games silver medalists for North Korea
Asian Games medalists in football
Medalists at the 1998 Asian Games
20th-century North Korean women